The Smith & Wesson Model 916 is a pump-action 12-gauge shotgun produced by Smith & Wesson during the 1970s.

History
Noble Manufacturing Company of Haydenville village within Williamsburg, Massachusetts, was a small gunmaker that produced shotguns and .22 caliber rifles. Noble, incorporated in 1943, was in bankruptcy as of mid-1971, and went out of business in 1973.

Smith & Wesson produced the shotgun as their Model 916, with a sportsman version (916), takedown version (916T), and tactical version (916A). The guns were plagued by a variety of quality issues, including a recall due to a safety issue with barrels of the 916T version rupturing. The series was later discontinued and replaced by the pump-action Model 3000 and the semi-automatic Model 1000.

References

External links
 Smith and Wesson Shotgun (Model 916) via YouTube
 Smith & Wesson Model 916A via YouTube

Smith & Wesson firearms
Pump-action shotguns
Shotguns of the United States